Lasiosphaeria is a genus of fungi in the family Lasiosphaeriaceae.

Species

L. alexandrae
L. alexandricola
L. angustispora
L. araneosa
L. aristata
L. bambusicola
L. biformis
L. bravoi
L. calligoni
L. calva
L. capitata
L. caraguatae
L. caryophylli
L. chapmanii
L. coacta
L. conica
L. culmicola
L. culmorum
L. cylindrospora
L. dactylina
L. depilata
L. elephantina
L. elinorae
L. encalyptae
L. faginea
L. felina
L. foliicola
L. geranii
L. gibberosa
L. glabra
L. glabrata
L. globularis
L. heterotricha
L. hispidula
L. insignis
L. invisibila
L. kamatii
L. lanuginosa
L. leptochaeta
L. meningiensis
L. meznaensis
L. miconiae
L. micranthi
L. microspora
L. mollis
L. monotropae
L. moseri
L. mucida
L. multiseptata
L. nematospora
L. ovina
L. pallida
L. paucipilis
L. phyllophila
L. polyporicola
L. porifera
L. punctata
L. pyramidata
L. racodium
L. rickii
L. rufula
L. rugulosa
L. setosa
L. sorbina
L. stictochaetophora
L. strigosa
L. tuberculosa
L. vestita
L. volvestriana

References

External links

Sordariomycetes genera
Lasiosphaeriaceae
Taxa named by Vincenzo de Cesati
Taxa described in 1863
Taxa named by Giuseppe De Notaris